Naghma Begum, or just Naghma (born 25 March 1945), is a Pakistani actress. She has worked in more than 350 Urdu and Punjabi movies from 1960 to 2018. In 2000, she was honoured with the "Lifetime Achievement Nigar Award" for her 50 years long acting career.

Early life
Naghma was born as Zubaida Begum on 25 March 1945 in Lahore, Punjab, British India.

Career
She first acted in director M.J. Rana'''s Punjabi film Rani Khan released in 1960. She did not get a major role in that film, but she got an identity through it. Naghma's second film was "Chaudhri" , directed by Muzaffar Tahir. This film was also in Punjabi language and she starred as the heroine in the film. That film was released on May 12, 1962.

Naghma's first Urdu film was director Shabab Kiranvi's Mehtab, which was a super hit. In that film, Nayyar Sultana and Habib played the lead roles. A song from the movie "Gol Gappay Wala Aya Gol Gappay Laya" in the voice of Ahmed Rushdi became very popular. Meanwhile, her second Urdu film "Maan Ke Ansu" was released in 1963. The director of this film was also Shabab Kiranvi. The hero of the film was Habib and the heroine was Neer Sultana. Naghama played the role of a side heroine in this film. In this film, she was paired with actor Roshan and the song "Saman Jab Piyara Piyara Ho" pictured on them was very popular those days. Afterward, her career kept flourishing and she was a busy actress during the late 1960s and early 1970s.

From 1968 to 1974, Naghma was at peak of her film career. During that period, she was among the top film actresses along with Firdous, Rani, and  Rozina. Naghma and Habib's was one of the most popular romantic screen duos. After 1974, Naghama's career declined and she was replaced by Aasia, Sangeeta, Mumtaz and Najma. Being in the film industry for the past sixty years, she has worked in more than 350 films. She then worked in a Punjabi film Dikar Gujar Da which was released in 2018. After working in films then she started working in dramas such as Mil Ke Bhi Hum Na Mile, Jackson Heights, Sadqay Tumhare and Preet Na Kariyo Koi.

Personal life
Naghma first married a filmmaker and cameraman Akbar Irani but the marriage was not successful. Then, she married actor Habib, but divorced him later. Both had a daughter Zarina''. In the later years of her career, Naghma faced some financial issues.

Filmography

Television series

Film

Awards and recognition

References

External links
 

1945 births
20th-century Pakistani actresses
People from Lahore
Living people
Pakistani film actresses
Nigar Award winners
Actresses in Punjabi cinema
Pakistani television actresses
Actresses in Pashto cinema
21st-century Pakistani actresses
Actresses in Urdu cinema